Virage may refer to:

The Aston Martin Virage;
The Renault 12, which was rebranded "Virage" in Australia;
Virage, a creature in the Legend of Dragoon game.